Vargam is a 2006 Indian Malayalam-language action film written and directed by M. Padmakumar. The film stars Prithviraj Sukumaran, Renuka Menon, Vijayaraghavan, Devan and Captain Raju. Padmakumar who was an assistant director for Devasuram stated that Vargam is a tribute to the movie by following the same plot.

Plot
Solomon Joseph is the sub inspector of Police in charge of Rajakkadu station in Idukki.  He has learned the importance of money and power, and using it, he earns wads of money. He spends the money on booze and women. He is estranged with his father and step family. He is close to a catholic priest who is a fatherly figure to him.

Two influential businessmen, Ummachan and Vavachan, clashes frequently in Rajakkadu. Solomon is friendly with Vavachan and even assist him in smuggling narcotics through his area of control. Through a series of e events, Solomon lock horns with Ummachan's younger brother Denis. Denis, along with 4 friends, are visiting from Bangalore. Eventually, Solomon takes Denis and his friends in custody after a violent clash in the town club.

Ummachan manages to arrange bail for his brother and friends, but during the process, he threatens Solomon. The next day, when Solomon gets information that Dennis and friends have hired a local prostitute, he catches them in the act, with the intention of humiliating Ummachan along with getting as much bribe as possible for himself.

Ummachan is aiming to be the next candidate for the Legislative Assembly, and he fears that such an incident would impact his political future. He pleads with Solomon to let his brother go. But Solomon would not budge unless he is bribed 'properly'. They agree on a bribe of 3 lakhs to be delivered personally to Solomon. Ummachan tries to implicate Solomon in bribery charges. Solomon sniffs out the plan from Ummachan's nervous behavior and arrests Ummachan on charges for trying to  bribe a public official. The brothers are soon released on bail.

Dennis attacks Solomon that night, assisted by his friends. Solomon beats up the entire gang single handedly and takes Denis to the police station. The beating continues, and hours of beating up takes their toll, and Dennis dies. Solomon, with the help of the constable Chandikkunju, dispose of the body. He appears to get away with murder when he just gets a punishment transfer to the northern corner of Kerala. Ummachan threatens to leave Solomon.

He takes charge of Badiyadka police station. The area is de facto ruled by Abubaker Haji,  a wealthy smuggler and son Shereef. Haji made all his fortune by cheating his wealthy mentor Valiyaveetil Baputi. Baputi's wife and his daughter Nadia are facing eviction from their home because of Baputi's debts of 12 lakhs. Haji refuses to help them. Shereef tries to molest Nadia, and she files a complaint to the new Sub Inspector. Solomon befriends Abubaker Haji and takes his side in exchange for a bribe. This leads to a public clash between Solomon and Nadia. Solomon plots with Shereef's henchman Syed to publicly humiliate Nadia by arresting her in charge of prostitution. This leads to the death of a heart broken Nadia's mother. This was unexpected, and for the first time in his life, Solomon's conscience is dented.  On the night of the funeral,   Shareef tries to rape Nadia and Solomon saves her.

Chandikkunju turns up at Bathiyadukka and begs Solomon to give him 5 lakhs rupees for his daughter's marriage as Ummachan has created financial difficulties for him.  Ummachan is  chasing Chandikkunju for information on Denis' remains. Solomon visits Haji's office for financial assistance but received by Shereef, who refuses to pay Solomon anything because of the grudge he keeps. In return, Solomon hijacks Haji's bootlegging truck with cargo estimated to be of 15 million rupees and takes 2.5 million rupees instead of the half million he asked earlier. Haji though appears to be amicable while giving the bribe,  arranges Shereef and gang to attack Solomon. He gets near fatal injuries,  but survives in hospital. Ummachan visits Solomon in hospital threatening to settle the scores once he fully recovers. Ummachan also hints that he has killed Chandikkunju who refused to disclose information on Denis' remains.

When Solomon gets discharged, he is repentant of his corrupt life. He falls in love with Nadia and wants to marry her. He reconciles with his family,  but it's too late for his father as he passes away before Solomom arrives.

The day previous to their marriage, Ummachan, with the help of Haji and Shareef, kidnaps Nadia and uses her as a bait to Solomon to take his revenge on his lost brother's life. Vavachan arrives to help Solomon and save Nadia.  The film ends with Ummachan getting killed by Solomon.

Cast

Production
The film was shot in Thodupuzha and Ambalamugal in Kerala.

Soundtrack
1. Kaavalay -
Vidhu Prathap

2. Paalazhithumbi -
Madhu Balakrishnan

Release 
Despite positive reviews from critics it was a box office failure.

References

External links
 
 http://popcorn.oneindia.in/title/2024/vargam.html

2006 films
2000s crime drama films
2000s Malayalam-language films
Indian crime drama films
Indian action drama films
Films scored by Ouseppachan
2006 action drama films
Indian crime action films
2000s crime action films
Films directed by M. Padmakumar